Lerone Bennett Jr. (October 17, 1928 – February 14, 2018) was an African-American scholar, author and social historian who analyzed race relations in the United States. His works included Before the Mayflower (1962) and Forced into Glory (2000), a book about U.S. President Abraham Lincoln.

Born and raised in Mississippi, Bennett graduated from Morehouse College. He served in the Korean War and began a career in journalism at the Atlanta Daily World before being recruited by Johnson Publishing Company to work for JET magazine. Later, Bennett was the long-time executive editor of Ebony magazine. He was associated with the publication for more than 50 years. Bennett also served as a visiting professor of history at Northwestern University.

Biography

Early life and education
Bennett was born in Clarksdale, Mississippi, on October 17, 1928, the son of Lerone Bennett Sr. and Alma Reed. When he was young, his family moved to Jackson, Mississippi, the capital.  His father worked as a chauffeur and his mother was a maid but they divorced when he was a child. At twelve he began writing for The Mississippi Enterprise, a Jackson, Mississippi, black owned paper.  He recalled once getting in trouble for being distracted from an errand when he happened upon a newspaper to read.  He attended segregated schools as a child under the state system, and graduated from Lanier High School. Bennett attended Morehouse College in Atlanta, Georgia, where he was classmates with Martin Luther King Jr. Graduating in 1949, Bennett recalled that this period was integral to his intellectual development. He also joined the Kappa Alpha Psi fraternity.

Career
Bennett served as a soldier during the Korean War, and later pursued graduate studies. He was a journalist for the Atlanta Daily World from 1949 until 1953. He also worked as city editor for JET magazine from 1952 to 1953. The magazine had been established in 1945 by John H. Johnson, who founded its parent magazine, Ebony, that same year. In 1953, Bennett became associate editor of Ebony magazine and then executive editor from 1958. The magazine served as his base for the publication of series of articles on African-American history. Some were collected and published as books.

Bennett wrote a 1954 article "Thomas Jefferson's Negro Grandchildren", about the 20th-century lives of individuals claiming descent from Jefferson and his slave Sally Hemings. It brought black oral history into the public world of journalism and published histories. This relationship was long denied by Jefferson's daughter and two of her children, and mainline historians relied on their account. But new works published in the 1970s and 1990s challenged the conventional story. Since a 1998 DNA study demonstrated a match between an Eston Hemings descendant and the Jefferson male line, the historic consensus has shifted (including the position of the Thomas Jefferson Foundation at Monticello) to acknowledging that Jefferson likely had a 38-year relationship with Hemings and fathered all six of her children of record, four of whom survived to adulthood.
 
Bennet served as a visiting professor of history at Northwestern University. He authored several books, including multiple histories of the African-American experience.  These include his first work, Before the Mayflower: A History of Black America, 1619–1962 (1962), which discusses the contributions of African Americans in the United States from its earliest years.  His 2000 book, Forced into Glory: Abraham Lincoln's White Dream, questions Abraham Lincoln's role as the "Great Emancipator".  This last work was described by one reviewer as a "flawed mirror." It was criticized by historians of the Civil War period, such as James McPherson and Eric Foner. Bennett is credited with the phrase: "Image Sees, Image Feels, Image Acts," meaning the images that people see influence how they feel, and ultimately how they act.

A longtime resident of Kenwood, Chicago, Bennett died of natural causes at his home there on 14 February 2018, aged 89.

Personal life
A Catholic, Bennett married Gloria Sylvester (1930–2009) on July 21, 1956 at St. Columbanus Church in Chicago. They met while working together at JET. The couple had four children: Alma Joy, Constance, Courtney, and Lerone III (1960–2013).

Legacy and honors
2003 – Carter G. Woodson Lifetime Achievement Award from Association for the Study of African American Life and History
1978 – Literature Award of the American Academy of Arts and Letters
1965 – Patron Saints Award from the Society of Midland Authors
1963 – Book of the Year Award from Capital Press Club
1982 – Candace Award from the National Coalition of 100 Black Women
 Honorary degrees from Morehouse College, Wilberforce University, Marquette University, Voorhees College, Morgan State University, University of Illinois, Lincoln College, and Dillard University.

Bibliography
Before the Mayflower: A History of Black America, 1619–1962 (1962)
What Manner of Man: A Biography of Martin Luther King, Jr. (1964) 
Confrontation: Black and White (1965)
Black Power U.S.A.: The Human Side of Reconstruction 1867–1877 (1967)
Pioneers In Protest: Black Power U.S.A. (1968)
The Challenge of Blackness (1972)
The Shaping of Black America (1975)
Wade in the Water:  Great Moments in Black History (1979)
Forced into Glory: Abraham Lincoln's White Dream (2000), Chicago: Johnson Pub. Co. (review by Eric Foner)

References

Further reading
 Barr, John M.  "Holding Up a Flawed Mirror to the American Soul: Abraham Lincoln in the Writings of Lerone Bennett Jr." Journal of the Abraham Lincoln Association 35.1 (2014): 43-65.  online
 West, E. James. "Lerone Bennett, Jr.: A Life in Popular Black History." The Black Scholar 47.4 (2017): 3-17.
 West, E. James. Ebony Magazine and Lerone Bennett Jr.: Popular Black History in Postwar America (Urbana: University of Illinois Press, 2020).

External links
Bennett's biography
Lerone Bennett Jr.'s oral history video excerpts at The National Visionary Leadership Project

Lerone Bennett Jr. Papers at Stuart A. Rose Manuscript, Archives, and Rare Book Library, Emory University
Discussion panel featuring Lerone Bennett Jr. at the 22nd annual convention of the National Association of Black Journalists on KUT's "In Black America" radio program, September 1, 1998 at the American Archive of Public Broadcasting

1928 births
2018 deaths
People from Clarksdale, Mississippi
African-American historians
Journalists from Mississippi
Writers from Georgia (U.S. state)
Historians from Mississippi
Johnson Publishing Company
Morehouse College alumni
African-American journalists
Journalists from Georgia (U.S. state)
American Book Award winners
Deaths from dementia in Illinois
African-American Catholics
20th-century African-American people
21st-century African-American people